The geology of Saba represents a young Pleistocene volcanic island. The oldest rocks are overlain by the Sugar Loaf-White Wall Formation shallow marine limestone. Mt. Scenery is the island's highest point and records a pyroclastic volcano that is the highest point in the Kingdom of the Netherlands. Zion's Hill or Hell's Gate is part of a basaltic andesite lava flow.

References

Geography of Saba (island)
Natural history of Saba
Saba
Saba
Volcanism of North America
Pleistocene volcanoes